"Apparatus" is a song by Swedish heavy metal band Bombus, it was released as a single from their second studio album The Poet and the Parrot, on digital download and on 7" vinyl limited to 500 copies.

Track listing

Music video
The music video, released on 8 May 2013, features the band drive to a pub to perform the song, in the crowded bar area, brawls between the pub patrons occur during their performance.

Personnel
 Feffe – Guitars, vocals
 Matte – Guitars, vocals
 Peter –	Drums
 Jonas – Bass

References

2013 singles
2013 songs